Exorstaenia is a genus of moths belonging to the family Tortricidae.

Species
Exorstaenia festiva Razowski & Becker, 2000
Exorstaenia nova Razowski & Becker, 2000

See also
List of Tortricidae genera

References

 , 2005, World Catalogue of Insects 5.

External links
tortricidae.com

Archipini
Tortricidae genera